USS Nightingale may refer to the following ships of the United States Navy:

 , was a slave ship captured in 1861 and sold in 1865
 , was a motorboat acquired  by the US Navy in 1917 and sold in 1919
 , was a coastal minesweeper acquired by the US Navy in 1940 and returned to the owner in 1944
 , was acquired by the US Navy in 1941 and struck from the Navy List in 1946
 , was a minesweeper commissioned in 1943 and struck from the Navy List in 1959

See also
 

United States Navy ship names